Narnia is a genus of leaf-footed bugs in the family Coreidae. There are about seven described species in Narnia.

Species
These seven species belong to the genus Narnia:
 Narnia coachellae Bliven, 1956 i g
 Narnia coachellea Bliven, 1956 c g
 Narnia femorata Stål, 1862 i c g b
 Narnia inornata Distant, 1892 i c g
 Narnia marquezi Brailovsky, 1975 i c g
 Narnia snowi Van Duzee, 1906 i c g b
 Narnia wilsoni Van Duzee, 1906 i c g b
Data sources: i = ITIS, c = Catalogue of Life, g = GBIF, b = Bugguide.net

References

Further reading

External links

 

Articles created by Qbugbot
Anisoscelidini
Coreidae genera